Ringodom or Proctor is the first release by Chicago's Head of Femur. It was released on August 19, 2003 on Greyday Productions.

Track listing
 "January on Strike" – 4:30
 "Curve that Byrd" – 3:21
 "Yeoman or Tinker" – 6:02
 "80 Steps to Jonah" – 3:10
 "Me, My Dad, My Cousin, and... Ronnie" – 3:09
 "Acme: The Summit of a Mountain" – 4:16
 "The True Wheel" – 3:57
 "Money is the Root..." – 3:35
 "Science Needed a Medical Man" – 3:28
 "Finally I've Made It Nowhere" – 4:25
 "The Car Wore a Halo Hat"

The CD includes an untitled hidden track in the pregap.

External links
Head of Femur official website
Ringodom or Proctor on Amazon.com

2003 debut albums
Head of Femur (band) albums